The below tables contain a sample list of benzodiazepines and benzodiazepine analogs that are commonly prescribed, with their basic pharmacological characteristics, such as half-life and equivalent doses to other benzodiazepines, also listed, along with their trade names and primary uses. The elimination half-life is how long it takes for half of the drug to be eliminated by the body. "Time to peak" refers to when maximum levels of the drug in the blood occur after a given dose. Benzodiazepines generally share the same pharmacological properties, such as anxiolytic, sedative, hypnotic, skeletal muscle relaxant, amnesic, and anticonvulsant effects. Variation in potency of certain effects may exist amongst individual benzodiazepines. Some benzodiazepines produce active metabolites. Active metabolites are produced when a person's body metabolizes the drug into compounds that share a similar pharmacological profile to the parent compound and thus are relevant when calculating how long the pharmacological effects of a drug will last. Long-acting benzodiazepines with long-acting active metabolites, such as diazepam and chlordiazepoxide, are often prescribed for benzodiazepine or alcohol withdrawal as well as for anxiety if constant dose levels are required throughout the day. Shorter-acting benzodiazepines are often preferred for insomnia due to their lesser hangover effect.

It is fairly important to note that elimination half-life of diazepam and chlordiazepoxide, as well as other long half-life benzodiazepines, is twice as long in the elderly compared to younger individuals. Due to increased sensitivity and potentially dangerous adverse events among elderly patients, it is recommended to avoid prescribing them as specified by the 2015 American Geriatrics Society Beers Criteria.  Individuals with an impaired liver also metabolize benzodiazepines more slowly. Thus, the approximate equivalent of doses below may need to be adjusted accordingly in individuals on short acting benzodiazepines who metabolize long-acting benzodiazepines more slowly and vice versa. The changes are most notable with long acting benzodiazepines as these are prone to significant accumulation in such individuals and can lead to withdrawal symptoms. For example, the equivalent dose of diazepam in an elderly individual on lorazepam may be half of what would be expected in a younger individual. Equivalent doses of benzodiazepines differ as much as 20 fold.

Pharmacokinetic properties of various benzodiazepines
Equivalency data in the table below is taken from the Ashton "Benzodiazepine Equivalence Table".

Atypical benzodiazepine receptor ligands

Controversy
In 2015 the UK's House of Commons attempted to get a two to four week limit mandate for prescribing benzodiazepines to replace the two to four week benzodiazepine prescribing guidelines, which are merely recommended.

Binding data and structure-activity relationship

A large number of benzodiazepine derivatives have been synthesised and their structure-activity relationships explored in detail. This chart contains binding data for benzodiazepines and related drugs investigated by Roche up to the late 1990s (though in some cases the compounds were originally synthesised by other companies such as Takeda or Upjohn). Other benzodiazepines are also listed for comparison purposes, but it does not however include binding data for;
 Benzodiazepines developed in the former Soviet Union (e.g. phenazepam, gidazepam etc.)
 Benzodiazepines predominantly used only in Japan (e.g. nimetazepam, flutoprazepam etc.)
 4,5-cyclised benzodiazepines (e.g. ketazolam, cloxazolam etc.), and other compounds not researched by Roche
 Benzodiazepines developed more recently (e.g. remimazolam, QH-ii-066, Ro48-6791 etc.)
 "Designer" benzodiazepines for which in vitro binding data is unavailable (e.g. flubromazolam, pyrazolam etc.)
While binding or activity data is available for most of these compounds also, the assay conditions vary between sources, meaning that in many cases the values are not suitable for a direct comparison. Many older sources used animal measures of activity (i.e. sedation or anticonvulsant activity) but did not measure in vitro binding to benzodiazepine receptors. See for instance Table 2 vs Table 11 in the Chem Rev paper, Table 2 lists in vitro pIC50 values matching those below, while Table 11 has pEC50 values derived from in vivo assays in mice, which show the same activity trends but cannot be compared directly, and includes data for compounds such as diclazepam and flubromazepam which are not available in the main data set.

Also note;
 IC50 / pIC50 values represent binding affinity only and do not reflect efficacy or pharmacokinetics, and some compounds listed are GABAA antagonists rather than agonists (e.g. flumazenil).
 Low IC50 or high pIC50 values indicate tighter binding (pIC50 of 8.0 = IC50 of 10nM, pIC50 of 9.0 = IC50 of 1nM, etc.)
 These are non subtype selective IC50 values averaged across all GABAA receptor subtypes, so subtype selective compounds with strong binding at one subtype but weak at others will appear unusually weak due to averaging of binding values (see e.g. CL-218,872)
 Finally, note that the benzodiazepine core is a privileged scaffold, which has been used to derive drugs with diverse activity that is not limited to the GABAA modulatory action of the classical benzodiazepines, such as devazepide and tifluadom, however these have not been included in the list below. 2,3-benzodiazepines such as tofisopam are also not listed, as these act primarily as AMPA receptor modulators, and are inactive at GABAA receptors.

See also 
 Benzodiazepine
 Benzodiazepine dependence
 Benzodiazepine withdrawal syndrome

References

Further reading